Mill Green may refer to:

 Mill Green, Babergh, a hamlet in Suffolk, England
 Mill Green, Buxhall, a hamlet in Suffolk, England
 Mill Green, Cambridgeshire, England
 Mill Green, Essex, a hamlet in Essex, England
 Fryerning Mill, a windmill in Mill Green, Essex near Fryerning, Essex, England
 Mill Green, Hampshire, a location in England
 Mill Green, Hertfordshire, an area of Hatfield, England
 Mill Green Watermill, a watermill in Hertfordshire
 Mill Green, Norfolk, a location in England
 Mill Green, Shropshire, a location in England
 Mill Green, Staffordshire, a location in England
 Mill Green, Stonham Aspal, a hamlet in Suffolk, England
 Mill Green Historic District, a community located in Street, Maryland, United States